"The Heart Wants What It Wants" is a song by American singer Selena Gomez. It was released on November 6, 2014, through Hollywood Records, as the lead and only single from her compilation album For You (2014). The song was written by Gomez, Antonina Armato, David Jost and Tim James. Armato and James, who collectively form the production duo Rock Mafia, also produced the song. A mid-tempo pop and R&B track with a minimal electropop beat, its accompanying music video was premiered on November 6, 2014, alongside the premiere of the song itself. It is Gomez's last single release under the label.

Music critics mostly commended the song's lyrical content, production, vocals, and Gomez's new direction. The song reached number six on the Billboard Hot 100. It also reached the top ten in Canada, Denmark, Lebanon, and South Africa, as well as the top 40 in thirteen additional countries.

Background and release
Gomez said about the song, "And it's also a step for me knowing like, 'Ok, this is what I'm about to say, and I need to say it when I'm ready' [...] And I think after this year, it's the perfect way to end the year, it's the perfect way to end a chapter in a way. It's like, this is what I'll say about every single person that has judged me for every decision that I've made, for every person, [and] heart that is being judged for something they've done, and now I just want to release it," Gomez stated in an interview with Ryan Seacrest on 102.7 KIIS FM during the world premiere of "The Heart Wants What It Wants." In its first day on radio, the song had a listening audience of 10.061 million.

A demo of the song was recorded by American singer Gwen Stefani under the title "My Heart Wants What It Wants", which leaked online in December 2022.

Composition and lyrical interpretation

"The Heart Wants What It Wants" was written by Selena Gomez, Antonina Armato, David Jost, and Tim James.  It is a midtempo pop and R&B song, that contains a minimal electropop beat complete with finger snaps, ominous synths and haunting groans. Several critics noted the reminiscence of the song to the works by singers Lorde and Lana Del Rey.
Lyrically, Gomez details being in love with a bad boy despite knowing he may not be a stand-up guy. She sings, "The bed's getting cold and you're not here / The future that we hold is so unclear / But I'm not alive until you call / And I'll bet the odds against it all... / There's a million reasons why I should give you up / But the heart wants what it wants."

The title is from a letter by Emily Dickinson. The saying was popularized in 2001 when it was quoted by Woody Allen in an interview about his relationship with Soon-Yi Previn.

Critical reception
Lucas Villa of AXS favorably compared "The Heart Wants What it Wants" to the music of Lana Del Rey for Gomez's use of "trip hop beats, guitar and distorted Emile Haynie-styled yelps" alongside her "darkest" lyrics yet. He further wrote that the song "stands as a heartbreaking revelation in her five-year-old songbook, one that's vulnerably beautiful and unapologetically honest." Tim Sendra of AllMusic highlighted the song and praised it by calling it "very adult and real-sounding" and adding that "she acquits herself well here too." Popology Now called this song "emotionally charged." The Huffington Post Christopher Rosen deemed the song "a fairly good anthem for those going through heartbreak."

Idolator praised the song: "The Rock Mafia-produced gem shows the former teen queen in an entirely new light. There’s a vulnerability we haven’t seen before as Selena sings about the dark side of her very own fairytale with palpable honesty and conviction" and the editor called it the selling point of an album and added that if Selena follows this direction, many hits will be coming for her."  The Times of India editor Kasmin Fernandes added that this song shows her in an "entirely new light." Renowned for Sound was also positive: "smooth dose of pop with a second-guessing love storyline." When reviewing single, Music Times concluded: "Emotional song channels Justin Bieber drama but is still stunning on its own."

Accolades
"The Heart Wants What It Wants" won the award for Best Breakup Song at the 2015 Radio Disney Music Awards. It also received a nomination for Choice Break-Up Song at the 2015 Teen Choice Awards.

Chart performance

During its first week, "The Heart Wants What It Wants" sold 103,000 digital copies in the United States, which allowed it to debut at number six in the list Digital Songs. These sales gave Gomez her second best debut on the list, after "Who Says" with her band Selena Gomez & the Scene, which debuted with 116,000 copies. The Billboard Hot 100 list, which combines the single's digital sales, plus its performance on the radio and streaming, debuted at number twenty-five; the best entry of the week. In Streaming Songs it debuted at number thirty-seven because it received 3.1 million streams. After performing the song at the American Music Awards on November 23, 2014, Gomez received  her second top 10 on the Billboard Hot 100, and it reached number six, the same position obtained by "Come & Get It" in May 2013. The week after its introduction, the song sold 136,000 copies and reached number five on Digital Songs, since it had a 98% increase in downloads compared to the previous week. Simultaneously, it reached the fifth position in Streaming Songs and debuted at number forty-two on Radio Songs. In the latter, managed to position itself as her second top ten, again behind "Come & Get It". In the counting of Pop Songs, based on the level of airplay that songs receive on pop radio stations in the United States, "The Heart Wants What It Wants" became Gomez's third top 10 single in her solo career and her third consecutive single that make it to the first ten. On the other hand, in late January 2015, the song debuted on the Hot Dance Club Songs chart, marking the most popular songs in the dance clubs of the United States. As of May 2017, the single has sold 1.4 million copies in the United States.

In Canada it also achieved the best debut in its first week, at number nine. This automatically turned "The Heart Wants What It Wants" Gomez's third top 10 in the country and her second best positioned single after "Come & Get It" which peaked at number six followed by "Love You like a Love Song", which reached the tenth position. Weeks later "The Heart Wants What It Wants" equaled the position of "Come & Get It" in the Canadian territory.

Music video
The music video was filmed in black and white in California and directed by Dawn Shadforth over a year before its release. The video received over 9 million views in its first 24 hours. Actor Shiloh Fernandez appears in the music video as Gomez's love interest.

The UK edition of the International Business Times called the video "emotionally charged". Artist Direct wrote that the video contained "a painful, powerful and emotional visual opening."

, the video has accrued over 750 million views.

Live performance
Gomez performed the single for the first time at the 2014 American Music Awards. In her presentation, Gomez wore a skin-colored dress, and the background consisted of images as dark lights, thorns, roses, broken glass and wings appeared behind her on the screen. At the end of her performance, the singer added the phrase "I thought you were the one...".

Caitlin White from MTV described the visuals as "amazing" and said: "It is a more mature song for Selena, but one that almost everyone in the audience could relate, given the intense and emotional response public." The Wrap's Matt Donnelly wrote that it was "a considerable growth moment" for the singer. Casey Rackham of Zap2it called the performance "beautifully and emotionally intense." She commented that the use of wings was "pretty empowering."  After her presentation at the American Music Awards, the song went to number one on the Billboard Twitter Real-Time, position it had occupied in its release.

An instrumental version of the song was used as an interlude on the Revival Tour in 2016.

Track listings
Digital download
"The Heart Wants What It Wants" – 3:47

Digital download – remixes
"The Heart Wants What It Wants" (DJ Kue Remix) – 4:34
"The Heart Wants What It Wants" (DJ Kue Alternate Remix) – 4:28
"The Heart Wants What It Wants" (Cosmic Dawn Club Mix) – 6:57
"The Heart Wants What It Wants" (Cosmic Dawn Remix Edit) – 4:32
"The Heart Wants What It Wants" (Cosmic Dawn Club Mix) [Instrumental] – 6:57
"The Heart Wants What It Wants" (Ruff Loaderz Remix) - 5:19
"The Heart Wants What It Wants" (Ruff Loaderz Radio Remix) - 3:35
"The Heart Wants What It Wants" (Ultimix by Mark Roberts) – 5:49

Credits and personnel
Recording and management
 Recorded, Engineered and Mixed at Rock Mafia Studios 
 Mastered at Sterling Sound 
 Good Fellowship Publishing (ASCAP) administered by Seven Peaks Music (ASCAP); Downtown DLJ Songs obo Antonina Songs (ASCAP); David Jost Music Publishing (GEMA); Downtown DMP Songs obo Akashic Field Music (BMI)

Personnel

Selena Gomez – vocals, songwriting
Antonina Armato – songwriting; production, mixing (as part of Rock Mafia)
David Jost – songwriting 
Tim James – songwriting; production, mixing (as part of Rock Mafia)
Devrim Karaoglu – additional production
Steve Hammons – additional production, engineering, mix engineering
Dubkiller – additional production
Jon Vella – additional production
Xander Singh – additional production
Ace Ha – additional production
Adam Comstock – engineering
Rami Jaffee – vibraphone, mellotron
Chris Gehringer – mastering

Credits adapted from For You liner notes.

Charts

Weekly charts

Year-end charts

Certifications

References

2010s ballads
2014 singles
Selena Gomez songs
Pop ballads
Contemporary R&B ballads
Song recordings produced by Rock Mafia
Songs written by David Jost
Songs written by Tim James (musician)
Hollywood Records singles
Black-and-white music videos
Songs written by Antonina Armato
2014 songs
Songs written by Selena Gomez
Number-one singles in Greece
Songs about heartache